Bud Sasser (born May 29, 1992) is a former American football wide receiver. He played college football at Missouri. On June 4, 2015, Sasser was waived by the St. Louis Rams without ever officially signing his rookie contract, due to a pre-existing heart condition. On August 25, 2015, the Rams announced that they had hired Sasser as their external football affairs coordinator. Bud Sasser is currently attending Mizzou Law and has earned his MEd.

References

External links 
 
 Missouri Tigers bio

1992 births
Living people
American football wide receivers
American players of Canadian football
Canadian football wide receivers
Missouri Tigers football players
Sportspeople from Denton, Texas
Players of American football from Texas
Saskatchewan Roughriders players
St. Louis Rams players